Galician League may refer to:

 Galician League (A Coruña)
 Galician League (Santiago de Compostela)
 Galician Student League